AIK returned to the top flight in emphatic fashion, finishing just one point adrift of champions Elfsborg. Led by unproven coach Rikard Norling, the club has resurged quickly since the 2004 relegation, winning Superettan, and then coming close to winning the top flight-title . Superettan signings Wílton Figueiredo and Markus Jonsson quickly adjusted to Allsvenskan, both being key men in the title chase.

Squad

Transfers

In

Out

Loans out

Released

Trial

Friendlies

Royal League

Competitions

Overview

Allsvenskan

League table

Results summary

Results by matchday

Results

Svenska Cupen

Squad statistics

Appearances and goals

|-
|colspan="14"|Players away on loan:

|-
|colspan="14"|Players who appeared for AIK but left during the season:

|}

Goal scorers

Clean sheets

Disciplinary record

References

AIK Fotboll seasons
AIK